Nikolay Karasyov (born 29 November 1939) is a retired Russian shot putter. He competed at the 1964 Summer Olympics and finished in sixth place. He won a silver medal at the 1966 European Athletics Championships and was the gold medallist at the 1967 European Indoor Games.

References

1939 births
Living people
Athletes from Moscow
Soviet male shot putters
Russian male shot putters
Olympic athletes of the Soviet Union
Athletes (track and field) at the 1964 Summer Olympics
European Athletics Championships medalists
Universiade medalists in athletics (track and field)
Universiade silver medalists for the Soviet Union
Medalists at the 1965 Summer Universiade